The  2009 EA Sports Cup is the 36th staging of the League of Ireland football knockout competition.

Twenty nine clubs participated in this year's competition. The ten Premier Division, twelve First Division and the five non-reserve teams from the A Championship were joined by Kildrum Tigers, the 2008 Ulster Senior League champions, and the Kerry District League representative side. For the Preliminary, First and Second Rounds of the competition, all participating clubs were split into 4 regional pools with the further rounds of the competition having an open draw.

The 2009 EA Sports Cup kicked off on Monday, 30 March 2009 with the preliminary round. The Final was played on Saturday, 26 September 2009, and was won by Bohemians.

Preliminary round
The matches were played on Monday, 30 and Tuesday, 31 March 2009.

Pool 2

|}

First round
The matches were played on Monday, 13 and Tuesday, 14 April 2009.

Pool 1

|}

Pool 2

|}

Pool 3

|}

Pool 4

|}

Second round
The matches were played on Monday, 4 and Tuesday, 5 May 2009.

Pool 1

|}

Pool 2

|}

Pool 3

|}

Pool 4

|}

Quarter finals
The matches were played on Monday, 18 and Tuesday, 19 May 2009.

|}

Semifinals
The matches will be played on Monday, 3 and Tuesday, 4 August 2009.

Final

References

External links
 Official website

League of Ireland Cup seasons
3
Cup